Nemapogon tylodes is a moth of the family Tineidae. It is found in North America, where it has been recorded from Alberta, British Columbia, Maine, Massachusetts, New Hampshire, Ontario, Quebec and West Virginia.

References

Moths described in 1919
Nemapogoninae